Michael Nuttall (born 3 April 1934) is a former South African Anglican bishop and author.

He was educated at Maritzburg College, the University of Natal and Rhodes University and ordained in 1965. His first post was as a curate at  Grahamstown Cathedral where he was later to return as Dean. In 1975 he was elevated to the episcopate as  Bishop of Pretoria. After seven years he was  translated to Natal. He was Bishop of Natal until 2000. He continues to serve the Church in retirement.

Publications 

Nuttall has written and contributed to a number of works including:

 
 Authority in the Anglican Communion 1987
 Prayerfulness in the Spirit 2002
 
 
 Nuttall, Michael. "Receiving Communion from the Hands of a Woman Priest: A Milestone in the Life of the Church of the Province of Southern Africa." Women Hold Up Half The Sky: Women in the Church in Southern Africa (1991): 267–273.

References 

1934 births
20th-century Anglican Church of Southern Africa bishops
Alumni of Maritzburg College
Anglican bishops of Natal
Deans of Grahamstown
Living people
Rhodes University alumni